A list of thriller films released in the 1980s.

See also
 1980 in film

Notes

1980s
Thriller